Daraya may refer to the following places:

Daraya, Keserwan, a village in Keserwan District, Lebanon
Daraya, Zgharta, a village in Zgharta District, Lebanon
Darayya, a town in Rif Dimashq Governorate, Syria